Kevin R. Wendel (born c. 1957) is a retired officer of the United States Army. He attained the rank of major general, and his assignments included interim commander of First United States Army, commander of First Army Division East, commander of the 20th Chemical, Biological, Radiological, Nuclear and high-yield Explosives Command at Aberdeen Proving Ground, Maryland, and commander of 3rd Brigade, 1st Cavalry Division.

Early life and education
Kevin Robert Wendel was born in Bridgewater, New Jersey circa 1957, the son of Fred W. Wendel and Marie Elizabeth (Burns) Wendel. In 1975, he graduated from Bridgewater-Raritan High School West in Bridgewater, New Jersey.  Wendel graduated from Valley Forge Military Academy and College with an associate degree in 1977 and received his commission as a second lieutenant via Early Commissioning Program. He graduated from Furman University with a bachelor's degree in business administration and completed the last two years of his Reserve Officers' Training Corps training there as an Infantry officer.

Military career

Field rank
After completing the Infantry Officer Basic Course, Wendel served in a variety of command and staff positions in the United States, as well as completing assignments in South America, Europe and Southwest Asia.  He graduated from the Infantry Officer Advanced Course in 1983, after which he commanded Company D, 4th Battalion, 187th Infantry, 101st Airborne Division, followed by command of Headquarters and Headquarters Company, 3rd Brigade, 101st Division.

Wendel graduated from the United States Army Command and General Staff College in 1991, after which he held a variety of field grade officer staff positions, and commanded 1st Battalion, 327th Infantry Regiment.  He subsequently graduated from the United States Army War College, after which he served as special assistant to the commanding general of the 1st Cavalry Division at Fort Hood, Texas. Wendel holds a master's degree in public administration from Shippensburg University of Pennsylvania, and earned a master's degree in Strategic Studies and Theory from the Army War College.

20th Chemical, Biological, Radiological, Nuclear and high-yield Explosives Command
From 2000 to 2003, Wendel commanded 3rd Brigade, 1st Cavalry Division. In August 2003, he was assigned as chief of the strategy division in the Strategic Plans and Policy Directorate (J-5) on the Joint Staff at The Pentagon.  From 2004 to 2005, Wendel was assigned as assistant deputy director for Strategy and Policy (J-5) on the Joint Staff.

Wendel served as commander of the 20th Chemical, Biological, Radiological, Nuclear and high-yield Explosives Command (CBRNE) (originally called the 20th Support Command) at Aberdeen Proving Ground, Maryland from 2005 to 2008.  His subsequent assignments included director of operational maneuver for United States Army Central in Kuwait, and deputy director of Operations for United States Africa Command.

General officer
From 2011 to 2013, Wendel was commander of First Army Division East; during 2013, he was interim commander of First United States Army following the departure of John Michael Bednarek to serve as Chief of the Office of Security Cooperation (OSC) in Iraq, and prior to the arrival of Michael S. Tucker to assume command of First Army.

After leaving First Army, Wendel was assigned as commander of Combined Security Transition Command – Afghanistan (CSTC–A)/Ministerial Advisory Groups and Commander of North Atlantic Treaty Organization Training Mission – Afghanistan.  Wendel's first deputy commander with (CSTC–A) was Harold J. Greene, who was killed in action in August 2014.  Wendel completed this assignment in October 2014, and was succeeded by Todd T. Semonite.

Awards
Wendel received the Army Distinguished Service Medal for his accomplishments while in command of the 20th CBRNE Command, and again for his success while in command of First Army Division East and First United States Army.

Family
Wendel is the husband of Denise Jane Kaiser of Bridgewater, New Jersey.  They graduated from high school together, and were married in 1979.

Kevin Wendel is one of four sons born to Fred and Marie Wendel; his brothers include Jeffrey, a retired commander in the United States Navy, Dale, and Greg, also a retired Navy commander.

References

Sources

Internet

Newspapers

Books
 

1950s births
Living people
People from Somerset County, New Jersey
United States Army generals
United States Army personnel of the War in Afghanistan (2001–2021)
Valley Forge Military Academy and College alumni
Furman University alumni
Shippensburg University of Pennsylvania alumni
United States Army Command and General Staff College alumni
United States Army War College alumni
Recipients of the Distinguished Service Medal (US Army)
Military personnel from New Jersey